The Hampden County Memorial Bridge (sometimes referred to as Springfield Memorial Bridge) is a reinforced-concrete arch bridge that spans the Connecticut River between Springfield, Massachusetts and West Springfield, Massachusetts, constructed in 1922. The bridge is owned by Massachusetts Highway Department and is located on Massachusetts Route 147.

History and construction of the bridge
The Connecticut River was first bridged at Springfield in 1805, by an open wooden bridge said to have been "mongrel in style." It collapsed in 1814 and was replaced by a covered wooden Burr arch-truss bridge built by Isaac Damon of Northampton, Massachusetts. Partly rebuilt after a spring freshet in 1818, Damon's bridge survived into the 20th century, and was the structure which the present concrete arch bridge was built to replace.

In 1915, the Hampden County Commissioners opened hearings to discuss construction of a new bridge, but it wasn't until the winter of 1918/19 that the location and overall design of the present concrete arch bridge were finally agreed upon. The main construction contract (at $3,254,883 (US$ with inflation)) was let to H.P. Converse on April 3, 1920; the completed bridge was opened to traffic on August 3, 1922. At the ceremonies held that day, the bridge was dedicated as a memorial to "those who had died as pioneers, and soldiers in the Revolutionary, Civil and Foreign Wars."

The bridge was designed by Fay Spofford & Thorndike, with Haven & Hoyt, architects. When the bridge was refurbished in 1992, Fay Spofford & Thorndike was again involved.

Design
The Memorial Bridge features a seven-span, reinforced-concrete deck rib arches, with a nine-span reinforced concrete slab viaduct. Each of the river spans is made up of five Melan-type, two-hinged, reinforced-concrete arch ribs of parabolic profile. The three interior ribs in each span are grouped together near the center of the roadway where a streetcar line was originally located. The two outer ribs are more widely spaced and carry thin concrete fascia walls concealing an open-spandrel design. Reinforced-concrete spandrel columns carry the reinforced-concrete roadway. The viaduct spans the rail yard consists of a reinforced concrete slab deck carried by transverse bents of concrete-encased structural steel. The piers are granite-faced reinforced-concrete.

There were two gargoyles above the bridge on the south side that were removed when the bridge was upgraded several years ago. The four plaques on the central towers honor the original colonists, and veterans of the American Revolutionary War, American Civil War, and World War I.

The 1922 Memorial Bridge includes the longest single concrete arch span in Massachusetts. Its self-supporting steel rib arches represent an uncommon refinement of Melan's original idea – by making the steel arches self-supporting, and using them to support their own load plus the weight of the formwork and the wet concrete during construction, an initial compressive stress was developed in the steel prior to the setting of the concrete. This prestressing of the steel allowed a much higher proportion of its ultimate strength to be utilized, allowing, in turn, the use of smaller and lighter arch ribs and a less massive substructure.

1996 rehabilitation project

By the 1990s, the concrete above the arches was suffering from advanced Alkali-Silica Reactivity (ASR) attack. The 1996 rehabilitation project replaced the entire deck system. The decorative architectural elements were replaced either in kind using cast stone or replaced with architectural fiberglass reproductions. The viaduct over the railroad was replaced with adjacent precast/prestressed deck beams made continuous.

This project was completed by Daniel O'Connell's Sons in 1996.

See also
List of bridges documented by the Historic American Engineering Record in Massachusetts
List of crossings of the Connecticut River

References

External links

Massachusetts Highway Department bridge data

 ''This article incorporates text from MassDOT, a public domain work of the Commonwealth of Massachusetts

Bridges over the Connecticut River
Buildings and structures in Springfield, Massachusetts
Arch bridges in the United States
Bridges completed in 1922
1922 establishments in Massachusetts
Historic American Engineering Record in Massachusetts
Monuments and memorials in Massachusetts
Massachusetts populated places on the Connecticut River
Springfield metropolitan area, Massachusetts
Road bridges in Massachusetts
Bridges in Hampden County, Massachusetts
Former toll bridges in Massachusetts
Concrete bridges in the United States
Burr Truss bridges in the United States